Berlin: The Downfall 1945 (also known as The Fall of Berlin 1945 in the US) is a narrative history by Antony Beevor of the Battle of Berlin during World War II. It was published by Viking Press in 2002, then later by Penguin Books in 2003. The book achieved both critical and commercial success. It has been a number-one best seller in seven countries apart from Britain, and in the top five in another nine countries. Together this book and Beevor's Stalingrad, first published in 1998, have sold nearly three million copies.

Contents 
The book revisits the events of the Battle of Berlin in 1945 and narrates how the Red Army defeated the Wehrmacht and brought an end to Hitler's Third Reich as well as an end to the war in Europe. The book was accompanied by a BBC Timewatch programme on Beevor's research into the subject.

Prizes 
Beevor received the first Trustees' Award of the Longman-History Today Awards in 2003.

Publication notes
The book was published in the United States under the title of The Fall of Berlin 1945, and has been translated into 24 languages. The British paperback version was published by Penguin Books in 2003.

Reception
The book encountered criticism, especially in Russia, centering on the book's discussion of atrocities committed by the Red Army against German civilians. In particular, the book describes widespread rape of German women and female Soviet forced labourers, both before and after the war. The Russian ambassador to the UK denounced the book as "lies" and "slander against the people who saved the world from Nazism".

Oleg Rzheshevsky, a professor and the president of the Russian Association of World War II Historians, has stated that Beevor is merely resurrecting the discredited and racist views of Neo-Nazi historians, who depicted Soviet troops as subhuman "Asiatic hordes". He argues that Beevor's use of phrases such as "Berliners remember" and "the experiences of the raped German women" were better suited "for pulp fiction, than scientific research". Rzheshevsky also stated that the Germans could have expected an "avalanche of revenge" after what they did in the Soviet Union, but "that did not happen".

Beevor responded by stating that he used excerpts from the report of General Tsigankov, the chief of the political department of the 1st Ukrainian Front, as a source. He wrote: "the bulk of the evidence on the subject came from Soviet sources, especially the NKVD reports in GARF (State Archive of the Russian Federation), and a wide range of reliable personal accounts". Beevor also stated that he hopes Russian historians will "take a more objective approach to material in their own archives which are at odds to the heroic myth of the Red Army as 'liberators' in 1945".

UK historian Richard Overy, from the University of Exeter, has criticized Russian reaction to the book and defended Beevor. Overy accused the Russians of refusing to acknowledge Soviet war crimes, "Partly this is because they felt that much of it was justified vengeance against an enemy who committed much worse, and partly it was because they were writing the victors' history".

References

Antony Beevor, Berlin: The Downfall 1945 - Viking 2002 -

External links
 

Books by Antony Beevor
History books about World War II
2002 non-fiction books
Works about the Battle of Berlin